Eswarapatham Saravanapavan (born 15 December 1953)  is a Sri Lankan Tamil newspaper publisher, politician and Member of Parliament.

Early life
Saravanapavan was born on 15 December 1953. He was educated at Jaffna Hindu College. He has a Diploma in Business Administration.

Career
Saravanapavan is the managing director of the Uthayan and Sudar Oli Tamil newspapers.

Saravanapavan was one of the Tamil National Alliance's candidates in Jaffna District at the 2010 parliamentary election. He was elected and entered Parliament. He was re-elected at the 2015 parliamentary election.

Electoral history

References

External links

1953 births
Alumni of Jaffna Hindu College
Illankai Tamil Arasu Kachchi politicians
Living people
Members of the 14th Parliament of Sri Lanka
Members of the 15th Parliament of Sri Lanka
People from Northern Province, Sri Lanka
Sri Lankan Hindus
Sri Lankan Tamil businesspeople
Sri Lankan Tamil politicians
Tamil National Alliance politicians